Hasmukh Chandulal Patel (7 December 1933 – 20 January 2018) was an architect credited with making significant contributions to contemporary architecture in India in a career spanning over four decades in the latter half of 20th century. His works are held in high-regard alongside those of prominent Indian architects in the post-independence era like Achyut Kanvinde, Charles Correa, Anant Raje, B.V. Doshi and others.

Patel was the founder of the Ahmedabad based architecture firm HCP Design Planning and Management Pvt Ltd. He was also a part of the small group of architects who nurtured the School of Architecture, CEPT (now CEPT University). He was its Honorary Director from 1972 to 1980 and Dean from 1976 to 1983. During this period CEPT consolidated its position as a premier institution.

Biography 
Hasmukh C. Patel was born in Bhadran, a small village of Gujarat. He lived in Vadodara with his father Chandubhai Rambhai Patel, mother Shantaben and grew up with five siblings. His father was an engineer who ran a small construction business and Patel would often visit the sites that he was working on. After high school, he pursued a bachelor's degree in architecture at Maharaja Sayajirao University of Baroda and graduated in 1956. He left India to study further at Cornell University, Ithaca, New York and graduated with a master's degree in architecture in 1959. He traveled extensively in Europe and Africa before returning to India and joined the architectural firm of Atmaram Gajjar in Ahmedabad.

Shortly after that in 1961, Patel started his own practice under the name of M/s Hasmukh C. Patel, now known as HCP Design Planning and Management. His first office was in the old city of Ahmedabad. Through the 1970s and ’80s, Patel's practice grew rapidly and moved to bigger offices, making it possible for him to have a setup with facilities and a layout that fully supported the working style that he believed in. In 1988, the practice shifted to Paritosh in Usmanpura, Ahmedabad, a building built by him, which houses the practice till date.

Patel's practice gave Ahmedabad some iconic buildings that dot the city's skyline. His work covered a diverse range of projects — townships, industrial units, hotels, hospitals, housing, public buildings, commercial complexes, academic institutes, cinemas and sports facilities. In a career spanning four decades, he designed 300 buildings, including landmarks such as the Patang Hotel, Reserve Bank of India, Refurbishment of Eden Gardens Stadium (Kolkata) and Centre Point Apartments. He demonstrated that the speculative model could be used to make profitable buildings which would be an architectural asset to the city. Patel was also a key figure in reviving interest and mobilizing support for the Sabarmati Riverfront Development Project in 1970s and for constituting RFDG (Riverfront Development Group) that consisted of local private architecture businesses.

He was a distinguished professor and Dean Emeritus at CEPT University. He was a visiting professor at the University of British Columbia, Vancouver and the University of Bristol. His work has been featured in numerous journals and books across the globe including India, UK, US, France, and Italy. He was married to Bhakti Patel and they have two children — architect-planner Bimal Patel who leads HCP Design, Planning & Management Pvt. Ltd and architect Canna Patel who leads HCP Interior Architecture Pvt. Ltd.

Selected projects 
 1963: Newman Hall (Premal Jyoti), Ahmedabad
 1964: State Bank of India, Ahmedabad
 1966: Diwan Ballubhai School, Ahmedabad
 1967: Medical and Social Welfare Centre, Mokasan
 1967: St. Xavier's Primary School, Ahmedabad
 1968: St. Xavier's Technical Institute, Vadodara
 1969: Church at Cambay (Khambhat)
 1969: Usha Theatre, Rajkot
 1971: Reserve Bank of India, Ahmedabad
 1974: Bhaikaka Bhavan, Ahmedabad
 1974: Dena Bank, Ahmedabad
 1975: Reading Centre, Gujarat University, Ahmedabad
 1976: Central Laboratory, Gujarat University, Ahmedabad
 1976: HK House, Ahmedabad
 1977: Carmel Convent Hostel, Gandhinagar
 1977: Sardar Patel Institute Hostel, Ahmedabad
 1978: Chinubhai Centre and Patang Hotel, Ahmedabad
 1979: St. Xavier's High School, Gandhinagar
 1979: Shyamal Row Houses, Ahmedabad
 1981: Centre Point Apartments, Ahmedabad
 1984: Gujarat Tourism Bhavan, Gandhinagar (Proposed)
 1984: Maitry Row Houses, Surat
 1985: Paritosh Building, Ahmedabad
 1986: Refurbishment of Eden Gardens Stadium, 1987, Kolkata
 1993: International Stadium, Cochin (Proposed)

Awards 
 1998: Baburao Mhatre Gold Medal for Life Time Achievement, Indian Institute of Architects
 2000: Great Master's Award by J. K. Cement for his contribution to architectural profession
 2011: Lifetime Achievement Award, Architects and Interiors India Awards

Further reading 
 Catherine Desai and Bimal Patel, The Architecture of Hasmukh C. Patel Selected Projects 1963-2003, Mapin Publishing, Ahmedabad 2017, 
 Jon Lang, Madhavi Desai and Miki Desai, Architecture and Independence, Oxford University Press, 
 Peter Scriver, Vikram Bhatt, After the Masters, Grantha Corporation, 
 Rutul Joshi, પોતાની ઇમારતોથી અમદાવાદને આધુનિક ઓળખ આપનારા હસમુખ પટેલ, BBC Gujarati

References

20th-century Indian architects
Artists from Ahmedabad
Gujarati people
1933 births
2018 deaths
Cornell University alumni
21st-century Indian architects
Maharaja Sayajirao University of Baroda alumni